Konstantin Sokolov (born May 12, 1991) is a Russian professional ice hockey forward currently playing with HC Sochi of the Kontinental Hockey League (KHL). Sokolov previously played with Admiral Vladivostok of the KHL during the 2012–13 season.

References

External links

1991 births
Living people
Admiral Vladivostok players
Ak Bars Kazan players
Amur Khabarovsk players
Buran Voronezh players
JHC Bars players
Russian ice hockey forwards
Saryarka Karagandy players
HC Sibir Novosibirsk players
Sportspeople from Oskemen
Stalnye Lisy players
HC Yugra players